Capital impairment is the case when the company lost its asset, so the asset is lower than the stock of a company. One way to avoid capital impairment is reduction of capital without any compensation.

See also
Bankruptcy
Reduction of capital

Corporate law
Financial capital
Equity securities